South Korea was the 5th most equal country in the world in 2019, however economic inequality is growing. According to data from 2010, low-income earners (those earning 12 million won or less) make up 37.8% of South Korea's labour force. Conversely, the highest income earners (those earning 100 million won or more) make up 1.4% of the labour force.

Current situation 
Among other countries in OECD, South Korea performs relatively well when considering indicators such as the Gini coefficient and Palma ratio, especially when limiting the comparison to countries with similar populations.

However, income polarization (the income gap) has not eased since the IMF stimulus, and thus is becoming more serious as of 2018.

In 2014, the poverty gap index was 39%, which ranked third overall among OECD countries. According to Wells X, the nation's top-tier 1390 people monopolize assets worth around 270 trillion won, comparable to the national budget.

In 2020, the COVID-19 pandemic has exacerbated economic inequality in South Korea. South Korea's President, Moon Jae-in, attributed a deepening wealth gap between the rich and the poor to the 2020 COVID-19 pandemic.

The following table shows the number of people and earned income by annual salary in Korea.

Counterargument 

In 2019, an article published on Xinhua claimed that the government-led economic growth policy resulted in a drop in South Korea's Gini index from 2018. However, it should be cautioned that the figure has only improved due to sluggish economic growth among high-income earners.

The 2019 film Parasite depicted drastic economic inequality between South Korea's wealthy and the poor, which is not necessarily reflected in reality. For contrast, 1% of the United States' top income earners earn 20% of the country's income, whereas the ratio is smaller in South Korea, with 12.2% of the population earning the same percentage of South Korea's total income.

Problems created by economic inequality 

Economic polarization creates many problems, though some of the following are more evident in South Korea:

Effects on South Korean youth 
Economic inequality is often linked to low or limited social mobility, a situation which may instill a sense of hopelessness among South Korea's youth. Gambling, though extremely limited due to its legality in South Korea, can be a dangerous source of debt for South Koreans who are susceptible to gambling and gambling addiction. In 2017, the availability of cryptocurrency in South Korea, combined with a lack of legal outlets for gambling, has contributed to gambling problems and associated debt.

Cause 
There are many causes for economic inequality, but the following causes are mainly talked about in Korea.

Foreign exchange crisis 
Not only the financial crisis itself, but also the ensuing contraction in domestic investment and worsening overall employment conditions. A slump in the domestic economy and strengthening the nation's economic structure dependent on exports. Before the Asian financial crisis, local companies used to make lax investments, ironically these over-investments had a positive impact on employment.

The intensification of social competition 
In the real economy, the imbalance of information results in reverse selection or moral hazard. The efficiency wage theory may be applied to solve the problems arising from this. Then, contrary to conventional wisdom, the phenomenon of "giving more to hardworking people than to work" occurs. It is easy to understand that there is a big difference in prize money even though the difference between first and second place is very small in a big competition. People who are confident of their own skills will prefer a competition with a big prize money because they think 'I can be number one.' It serves as a mechanism to drive out the uncompetitive and attract the competitive. In other words, in theory, the more strictly one considers who is good or bad, the more polarization can be intensified. For now, meritocracy is the clearest and most reasonable resource distribution standard in reality when there is no external pressure, so it is valid both in terms of efficiency and in terms of legitimacy. However, polarization is another matter. In other words, a legitimate society can be more polarized, and the oppositely unjust society can be called a more equal society. Simply saying that polarization is severe cannot determine that society is unjust.

Political inequality 
In his book The Great Leveler, Schaedel said that political inequality creates economic inequality. In the book, the author said, "As the nation has historically been formed, public power has been concentrated on a few people. In terms of hierarchy, it is a very sharp spire structure. These political inequalities have encouraged economic inequality," The Republic of Korea says that economic inequality has intensified since the 1990s as well as political inequality.

In the 2016 Hanyang University dissertation, a survey was conducted on the perception of economic inequality among generations. In the paper, 70 percent of the people held the government responsible for failing to narrow the income gap. So many modern people say that the current government's policy inequality is not helping to bridge the gap between the rich and the poor.

Employment deterioration 
The poverty of low-income people is getting worse due to the long-term deterioration of employment in South Korea. Therefore, the government has tried to increase employment every time over the past few years, but no results have been made yet. In an article published in the 2018 Korean Times, the IMF said Korea's income inequality was the poorest among 22 Asian-Pacific countries. In this article, the nation's economic growth is growing fast, but it also talked about inequality in household income due to the difficulty of finding jobs for young job seekers.

Solution 
One proposed solution to bridge the gap between the rich and the poor is the establishment of a universal social safety net. South Korea's share of government spending on welfare is among the lowest among OECD countries. There is a need to resolve the gap between the rich and the poor.

The state tries to bridge income inequality and the gap between the rich and the poor by intervening in the market without undermining the flow of the free market economic system.

As a representative economic policy for resolving income inequality, Korea has an income-led growth policy, and disaster support funds from around the world, which were prepared due to economic damage caused by Covid-19, can also be seen as efforts to bridge the gap between the rich and the poor in the short term and in numerical terms by guaranteeing basic income for low-income families.

A 2018 Korea University degree paper conducted a study on how social welfare policies improve economic inequality. The income of the top 10% was about 6.6 times the income of the lowest 10% in 1990. As of 2016 this has increased to about 10 times. The universal concept of social welfare is becoming increasingly prominent in the 21st century as economic inequality continues to rise. In the paper, two countries were cited as examples: Sweden, which developed industrial competitiveness based on marketism before implementing social welfare, and the United Kingdom, which maintained a balance between industrial competitiveness and welfare efficiency. The paper stated that the Korea public pension and the basic livelihood security system required more financial support. For health security, support was needed first for the lower-income class for the continuity of working welfare. In addition, in order to continuously supplement and develop industrial competitiveness, it is necessary education provides fair opportunities and discovers talent. It also states that it is necessary to divide the low-income class in Korea into recipients of welfare and the class directly above so that people do not feel a decline in their motivation to work.

References 

South Korea
Social issues in South Korea